Pam Blackwell (born November 9, 1942) is an American Jungian educator and theorist, as well as a playwright and novelist. She has been a meditation teacher for 40 years and directs "Morningstar Institute". In addition to its other services, "Morningstar Institute" offers online, college-level meditation courses.

A recipient of a National Endowment for the Arts Fellowship in 1985, her first novel, Ephraim's Seed, was published in 1995. It was the first of a projected four-novel series, The Millennial Series—a fictionalized account of happenings in the time just before and then during The Millennium. The following two novels in the series were Jacob's Cauldron (1998) and Michael's Fire (2002). The concluding novel in the series will be entitled David's Throne.

In addition to her novels, she wrote Christ-Centered Meditation: A Handbook for Spiritual Practice in 2011. She also authored the lyrics and book for the musical Parley P. Pratt's Great Escape, co-written with Jazz vocalist Kelly Eisenhour (a graduate of Boston’s Berklee College of Music and former backup singer for Gladys Knight).

Blackwell (aka Blackwell Mayes), has a doctorate from the Southern California University for Professional Studies in psychology and has founded The Sacred Hoop Healing Center, which provides support services for Native Americans. Her non-profit corporation, Morning Star Projects, provides assistance to the Northern Cheyenne nation. She is also the Director of Western Sandplay Associates. She is an associate member of the Sandplay Therapists of America (http://www.sandplay.org/index.htm). She has authored theoretical and practical articles in Jungian psychology as well as Jungian sand play therapy in such journals as the International Journal of Play Therapy (2006, vol. 15, no. 1, pp. 101–117) and Psychological Perspectives (2005, vol. 48, pp. 84–107).

References

1942 births
Living people
20th-century American novelists
American women novelists
Jungian psychologists
21st-century American novelists
American lyricists
American women dramatists and playwrights
20th-century American women writers
21st-century American women writers
20th-century American dramatists and playwrights